Afghan Sign Language is the deaf sign language of Jalalabad in eastern Afghanistan, possibly with some presence in Kabul. It has been encouraged in the country's only school for the deaf, and derives from the Deaf-community sign language of Jalalabad, but it's not known what connection it may have, if any, with the sign languages of other cities with established deaf populations, which are principally Kabul, Mazar-e Sharif, Herat, and Kandahar. American Sign Language was used in the Jalalabad school for a few years, and so may have had some influence on Afghan Sign.

References

Relevant literature
Power, Justin. 2014. Handshapes in Afghan Sign Language. MA thesis, University of North Dakota. Downloadable PDF copy

Sign language isolates
Languages of Afghanistan